Friar Rush is the title of a medieval Low German legend, surviving in a 1488 edition in verse form. During the 16th and 17th centuries, numerous High German, Scandinavian (Danish and Swedish), Dutch and English translations and adaptations in Volksbuch or chap book form were printed. The first High German edition dates to 1515, printed in Strassburg.
The story along with those of Till Eulenspiegel, Faust and Marcolf was among the most successful popular literature in 16th-century Germany.
The various adaptations vary in their style and focus, some intending to set a moral example or criticize excesses in monastic life, others simply intending to amuse the reader.

A connection between Friar Rush and Hödekin, a kobold figure of German folklore, was suggested by the Shakespeare scholar George Lyman Kittredge, who noted the connection has been made in Reginald Scott's Discoverie of Witchcraft, 1584. Kittredge (1900) criticizes the then-common identification of Friar Rush with Robin Goodfellow as simplistic.

Narrative
In the narrative, the devil enters a monastery posing as a man called Bruder Rausch (Broder Ruus and variants, in the English version Frier Rush; the Early Modern German ,  is the term for a loud swooshing noise). Acting as a prankster, Friar Rush causes various episodes of commotion among the monks. Working in the kitchen, Friar Rush takes to organizing women for the abbot and the other monks every night. On one occasion, he is about to be chastised by the cook for being delayed. Rush throws the cook into a boiling cauldron and takes his place, working to the satisfaction of the monks for seven years, but constantly causing strife among them. Rush's demonic identity is finally discovered by the abbot, who expels him from the monastery by means of the sacred mass. In the High German version, Rush then travels to England and possesses the king's daughter. He is again exorcized after the abbot is called in from Saxony for the purpose, who banishes the demon inside a hill near the monastery.

Friar Rush in other works
Friar Rush appears in Elizabethan playwright Thomas Dekker's If This Be Not a Good Play the Devill is in It.

Nineteenth-century German writer Wilhelm Hertz published a novel Bruder Rausch in 1882 based on the story.

Publication history
1488, Joachim Westfal, Stendal, Broder Rusche (Low German)
1515, Strasbourg (High German)
1519, Hans Dorn, Braunschweig (Low German)
ca. 1520, Servais Kruffter, Cologne, Staatsbibliothek Berlin Yg 6037; facsimile edition by Priebsch (1919).
1555, Hans Vingaard, Copenhagen, Broder Ruuses  Historie, Royal Library LN 937 8° (Danish)
1596 (Dutch)
1600, Laurentz Benedicht, Copenhagen, Royal Library LN 938 8° (Danish), directly derived from the Danish text of 1555.
1620, London, The Historie of Frier Rush: how he came to a house of Religion to seeke service, and being entertained by the Priour was first made under Cooke. Being full of pleasant mirth and delight for young people. (English); 1810 reprint
1645, Broder Ruus/ Thet aer/ Brodher Ruuses Historia Eller Chronica. Huruledes han vthi ett Cloester hafwer tient siw åhr foer en Kock/ och hwad han ther bedrifwit hafwer (Swedish)
1655, Stockholm, Broder Ruus/ Thet aer/ Brodher Ruuses | Historia | Eller | Chronica. Huruledes han vthi ett Cloe-ster hafwer tient siw åhr foer en | Kock/ och hwad han ther bedrif-wit hafwer: Foermerat medh een annan liten Hi-storia/ Lustigh at laesa, Royal Library F1700 1865.
1696, Copenhagen, Historie Om  Broder Rus Hvorledis hand hafver  tient for Kock oc Munck udi et Kloster  oc hvad hand  hafver bedrevet der  udi, Royal Library, Hielmstierneske Samling 1862 8° (Danish). Several 18th- to 19th-century prints were based on this text.

See also
Lubber fiend
Ship of Fools (satire)

References

Bibliography
Charles Harold Herford, Studies in the Literary Relations of England and Germany in the Sixteenth Century 1966, chapter 5.iv, pp. 193–322), .
G. L. Kittredge, "The Friar's Lantern and Friar Rush" PMLA 15.4 (1900: 415–441)
Ernst Götzinger, Reallexicon der Deutschen Altertümer, Leipzig 1885, p. 87.
Anz, Heinrich. Broder Rusche. In: Jahrbuch des Vereins für niederdeutsche Sprachforschung 24 (1899), 76–112.
Anz, Heinrich. Die Dichtung vom Bruder Rausch. Euphorion. Zeitschrift für Litteraturgeschichte 4 (1897), 756–772.
Bruun, Christian. Broder Russes Historie. Kjøbenhavn: Thieles Bogtrykkeri 1868.
Frandsen, Søren. Historien om Broder Rus. In: Frandsen, Søren et al. Bogen om Esrum Kloster. Helsingør: Frederiksborg Amt 1997, 169–187.
Frosell, Hampton. Hvem var Broder Rus? Meddelelser fra Rigsbibliotekaren. 35. årgang nr. 3 (1984), 3–12.
Priebsch, Robert. Die Grundfabel und Entwicklungsgeschichte der Dichtung vom Bruder Rausch. Prager Deutsche Studien 8 (1908), 423–434. 
Wolf, Ferdinand and Stephan Endlicher. Von Bruoder Rauschen. In: Scheible, Johann. Das Kloster vol. 11. Stuttgart: J. Scheible 1849, 1070–1118.

1488 books
German folklore
Medieval legends
Legendary German people
Fiction about the Devil